Pastoral Symphony (French: La Symphonie pastorale) is a 1946 French drama film directed by Jean Delannoy and starring Michèle Morgan, Pierre Blanchar and Jean Desailly.

The film is based on the novella La Symphonie Pastorale  by André Gide and adapted to the screen by Jean Aurenche.It was shot at the Neuilly Studios in Paris with sets designed by the art director René Renoux. Location shooting took place around Rossinière in Switzerland. The film's score was by Georges Auric. At the 1946 Cannes Film Festival, it won the Grand Prix (equivalent of the Palme d'Or) and the Best Actress award for Michèle Morgan.

It was the film chosen to be shown at the opening gala of the Cameo cinema in Edinburgh, Scotland, in March 1949, and a rare surviving print with English subtitles was shown there again in 2009 to celebrate the film's 60th anniversary, courtesy of the BFI.

Plot summary
The pastor of a mountain village adopts a small blind girl, Gertrude.  As Gertrude grows up into an attractive young woman, the pastor, now middle-aged, realises that he is in love with her. To his chagrin, his adopted son, Jacques, is also in love with Gertrude, even though he is shortly to be married to another woman.

Jacques's fiancée is jealous of Gertrude and arranges for her to see a doctor in the hope that she might be cured and to enable Jacques to choose equally between the two women.

Miraculously, Gertrude's sight is restored and she returns to the village a changed woman.  Unable to accept Jacques' love and disappointed by the pastor's affections for her, she realises that her former happiness has been lost forever.

Cast
 Michèle Morgan as Gertrude
 Pierre Blanchar as Le pasteur Jean Martens
 Line Noro as Amélie Martens - sa femme
 Jean Desailly as Jacques Martens - son fils
 Andrée Clément as Piette Castéran
 Jacques Louvigny as Castéran 
 Rosine Luguet as Charlotte Martens
 Mona Dol as Soeur Claire
 Robert Demorget as Pierre Martens
 Hélène Dassonville as Mademoiselle de la Grange
 Germaine Michel as La vieille paysanne
 Florence Brière as Une amie de Gertrude
 Albert Glado as Paul Martens

References

Bibliography
 Crisp, Colin. French Cinema—A Critical Filmography: Volume 2, 1940–1958. Indiana University Press, 2015.
 Leahy, Sarah & Vanderschelden, Isabelle. Screenwriters in French cinema. Manchester University Press, 2021.

External links
 
 
 La Symphonie Pastorale at filmsdefrance.com

1946 films
1946 drama films
Palme d'Or winners
Films based on short fiction
Films directed by Jean Delannoy
Films scored by Georges Auric
French black-and-white films
Films with screenplays by Jean Aurenche
Films shot in Switzerland
Pathé films
French drama films
1940s French-language films
1940s French films